U.S. Bicycle Route 30 (USBR 30) is an east–west U.S. Bicycle Route. , it consists of three segments, running though North Dakota, Wisconsin, Ohio, and Pennsylvania in the United States.

Description

|-
| ND || 
|-
| WI || 
|-
| OH || 
|-
| PA || 
|-
| Total || 
|}

The western segment of USBR 30 follows U.S. Route 12 and the historic Yellowstone Trail through the southwesternmost corner of the North Dakota for about  running between the state lines with Montana and South Dakota. The eastern segment follows the North Coast Inland Trail and local roads across northern Ohio and BikePA Route Z across Pennsylvania's Panhandle along the coast of Lake Erie. When fully complete, USBR 30 is expected to run across much of the country running from New Hampshire's Seacoast at USBR 1, incorporating a ferry crossing across Lake Michigan to a future junction with USBR 76 near West Yellowstone, Montana, running through New Hampshire, Vermont, New York, Pennsylvania, Ohio, Michigan, Wisconsin, Minnesota, South Dakota, North Dakota, and Montana along the way.

History
USBR 30 was first designated by the American Association of State Highway and Transportation Officials (AASHTO) in September 2018 along BikePA Route Z in Pennsylvania. In the fall of 2020, AASHTO designated the segment in Wisconsin, which runs from the Mississippi River at the Minnesota state line to Lake Michigan in Milwaukee. A few months later, AASHTO designated the portion in North Dakota, following the historic Yellowstone Trail, an historic auto trail that once connected Plymouth, Massachusetts, and Seattle by road with Yellowstone National Park. In May 2021, the eastern section was extended across northern Ohio to the Michigan state line.

Auxiliary routes

USBR 230 (Wisconsin)

USBR 230 is a loop off USBR 30 in Wisconsin. It provides a non-ferry alternative to the Merrimac Ferry on its parent route when it is not in operation.

USBR 230 (Ohio)

USBR 230 is a spur off USBR 30 along the southern shore of Lake Erie in Ohio.

References

External links

30
Bike paths in North Dakota
Bike paths in Wisconsin
Bike paths in Pennsylvania
Bike paths in Ohio